Paratorna pterofulva is a species of moth of the family Tortricidae. It is found in China (Sichuan).

The wingspan is about 17 mm. The forewings are yellowish brown with a conspicuous brown spot at the end of the discal cell. The hindwings are greyish white with a dark apex.

References

Moths described in 1988
Tortricini
Moths of Asia